Kaspars Dumpis (born December 23, 1982 in Ogre) is a Latvian former luger who has competed since 2002. He finished 17th in the men's singles event at the 2006 Winter Olympics in Turin.

Dumpis also finished 22nd in the men's singles event at the 2005 FIL World Luge Championships in Park City, Utah.

In 2014 Dumpis was appointed as coach of the Latvian luge team. 
As of 2019 Dumpis is assistant coach for the United States Junior luge team.

References

Sources
 2006 luge men's singles results
 Delfi.lv profile 
 FIL-Luge profile

External links

 
 
 
 

1982 births
Living people
Latvian male lugers
Olympic lugers of Latvia
Lugers at the 2006 Winter Olympics
People from Ogre, Latvia
Latvian sports coaches